Flavius Eusebius (died after AD 371) was a Roman Senator, who was the brother-in-law of the emperor Constantius II.

Biography
Born into a family originating from the city of Thessalonica, and of Macedonian descent, Eusebius was the son of Flavius Eusebius, the consul of AD 347. Probably through the influence of his sister Eusebia, the wife of Constantius II, Eusebius was appointed the governor of the province of Hellespontus in AD 355. While here, he was noted as an efficient governor, and an improvement on his predecessors.

After his term had completed, he went to Antioch where he was notified of his appointment as governor of Bithynia et Pontus, which he held in AD 356. He was then made consul prior alongside his brother Flavius Hypatius in AD 359.

Eventually moving back to Antioch, it was here in AD 371 that Eusebius was accused of treason and put on trial during the reign of the emperor Valens. Although he was found guilty, fined and exiled, he was soon recalled from his exile by the emperor, and his wealth and position were restored.

A Christian, Eusebius was deeply admired by the teacher of rhetoric, Libanius, who described him as an excellent orator. At some point, he was raised to the rank of Patrician by the emperor.

Sources
 Martindale, J. R.; Jones, A. H. M, The Prosopography of the Later Roman Empire, Vol. I AD 260–395, Cambridge University Press (1971)

References

4th-century Romans
Late Roman Empire political office-holders
Roman governors of Bithynia and Pontus
Imperial Roman consuls
Year of birth unknown
Year of death unknown
Flavii